Autumn in the Neighbourhood is the seventh studio album by English musical group China Crisis. It was released on the band's own Stardumb label in 2015, and was their first studio album in 21 years.

Track listing
"Smile (What Kind of Love Is This)" (Gary Daly) - 3:31
"Down Here On Earth" (Daly) - 3:18
"Autumn in the Neighbourhood" (Daly) - 3:48
"Because My Heart" (Daly, Gary "Gazza" Johnson) - 3:21
"Bernard" (Daly) - 3:59
"Joy and the Spark" (Daly) - 3:16
"Being in Love" (Daly, Eddie Lundon, Chris Barlow, Brian McNeill, Johnson) - 3:19
"Fool" (Lundon) - 3:50
"My Sweet Delight" (Daly) - 3:09
"Tell Tale Signs" (Daly) - 3:45
"Wonderful New World" (Daly) - 2:57

Personnel
China Crisis
Gary Daly – vocals
Eddie Lundon – guitar, vocals

References

2015 albums
China Crisis albums